Vinemont is an unincorporated community in Spring Township in Berks County, Pennsylvania, United States. Vinemont is located at the intersection of Vinemont and Indiandale Roads.

References

Unincorporated communities in Berks County, Pennsylvania
Unincorporated communities in Pennsylvania